The 1988 VI ACB International Tournament "V Memorial Héctor Quiroga" was the 6th semi-official edition of the European Basketball Club Super Cup. It took place at Pabellón Municipal de Puerto Real, Puerto Real, Spain, on 11, 12 and 13 October 1988 with the participations of Real Madrid (champions of the 1987–88 FIBA Korać Cup), FC Barcelona (champions of the 1987–88 Liga ACB), Jugoplastika (champions of the 1987–88 First Federal Basketball League) and CSKA Moscow (champions of the 1987–88 Supreme League).

League stage
Day 1, October 11, 1988

|}

Day 2, October 12, 1988

|}

Day 3, October 13, 1988

|}

Final standings 

European Basketball Club Super Cup
1988–89 in European basketball
1988–89 in Spanish basketball
1988 in Soviet sport
1988–89 in Yugoslav basketball
International basketball competitions hosted by Spain